Travis Sauter (born August 1, 1982) is an American professional stock car racing driver. A regular competitor in several midwestern racing series, he is second on the all-time win list with four Oktoberfest wins at the LaCrosse Fairgrounds Speedway.

Travis is the grandson of Jim Sauter, son of Tim, and nephew of Johnny and Jay.

Career
Sauter began his racing career in 2002, finishing second in the track championship at Madison International Speedway in 2006 before moving full-time to touring series events in 2007, having started running the ASA Late Model Series in 2004.

Competing primarily in the ASA Midwest Tour (now ARCA Midwest Tour), Sauter has won six times in 53 starts in the series, with a best points finish of seventh in 2008; he has also won four times in Oktoberfest races at La Crosse Fairgrounds Speedway.

Owning his own race team, Sauter currently competes in selected, high-profile events throughout the Midwest. In 2012, he won the inaugural Howie Lettow Memorial 150 at the Milwaukee Mile, topping a field of over 80 late models to win the event.

He finished second to Kyle Busch in the Howie Lettow Memorial 150 in 2013, before making his debut in NASCAR competition at Iowa Speedway in August, driving for Joe Nemechek. Sauter set the all-time track record at the 1/3 mile Dells Raceway Park on August 17, 2013 with a time of 13.108 seconds in his Super Late Model.

Sauter started his 2015 season by winning the inaugural Icebreaker 100 super late model at Dells Raceway Park in a feature field of 24 drivers.

Motorsports career results

NASCAR
(key) (Bold – Pole position awarded by qualifying time. Italics – Pole position earned by points standings or practice time. * – Most laps led.)

Nationwide Series

 Season still in progress 
 Ineligible for series points

ARCA Racing Series
(key) (Bold – Pole position awarded by qualifying time. Italics – Pole position earned by points standings or practice time. * – Most laps led.)

References

External links

Living people
1982 births
People from Necedah, Wisconsin
Racing drivers from Wisconsin
NASCAR drivers
ARCA Midwest Tour drivers
ARCA Menards Series drivers